Lodderena bunnelli is a species of minute sea snail, a marine gastropod mollusk in the family Skeneidae.

Description
The size of the shell attains 0.64 mm.

Distribution
This species occurs in the Atlantic Ocean off the Bahamas at a depth of 6 m.

References

  Redfern C. & Rolán E.. 2005. A new species of Lodderena (Gastropoda: Skeneidae) from the Bahamas. Iberus 23(2): 1–6.

bunnelli
Gastropods described in 2005